Paysan is the French word for "peasant". It may refer to:
Catherine Paysan, writer
Paisan, Italian film